The Fire-Eaters is a 2003 children's novel by David Almond.

Plot introduction
The novel is set in 1962, before and during the Cuban Missile Crisis.

Bobby Burns, who lives in the quiet coal-mining village of Keely Bay in Northumberland, has had a wonderful summer. But in autumn his father falls mysteriously ill, and he loathes his new school which is pervaded by bullying. Perhaps worst of all, Bobby is worried there will be a nuclear war.

Bobby's wonder-working friend Ailsa Spink and McNulty the crazy fire-eater open Bobby's eyes to the possibility of miracles.

Main characters
Robert 'Bobby' Burns
Mum
Dad
Joseph Connor
Ailsa Spink
McNulty, a fire-eater
Daniel Gower, a school friend of Bobby's
Mr Todd
Miss Bute

Reception
Kirkus Reviews wrote "Like the choicest of Almond, this is moody and layered." and "Breathtakingly and memorably up to Almond’s best." while Publishers Weekly concluded that "Sensitive readers will marvel at Almond's ability to show, not tell, with his highly introspective—at times enigmatic—writing style."

Awards and nominations
The Fire-Eaters won the Nestlé Smarties Book Prize Gold Award and the Whitbread Children's Book of the Year Award, as well as being shortlisted for both the Guardian Award and the Carnegie Medal.

References

2003 British novels
British children's novels
Fiction set in 1962
Novels set in Northumberland
Hodder & Stoughton books
2003 children's books